The atomic ratio is a measure of the ratio of atoms of one kind (i) to another kind (j). A closely related concept is the atomic percent (or at.%), which gives the percentage of one kind of atom relative to the total number of atoms. The molecular equivalents of these concepts are the molar fraction, or molar percent.

Atoms
Mathematically, the atomic percent is

 %
where Ni are the number of atoms of interest and Ntot are the total number of atoms, while the atomic ratio is

Isotopes
Another application is in radiochemistry, where this may refer to isotopic ratios or isotopic abundances. Mathematically, the isotopic abundance is

where Ni are the number of atoms of the isotope of interest and Ntot is the total number of atoms, while the atomic ratio is

Doping in laser physics
In laser physics however, the atomic ratio may refer to the doping ratio or the doping fraction.

For example, theoretically, a 100% doping ratio of Yb : Y3Al5O12 is pure Yb3Al5O12.
The doping fraction equals,

See also
Table of concentration measures

References

Physical chemistry